OMICS: A Journal of Integrative Biology is a peer-reviewed scientific journal of omics (e.g. genomics, proteomics, metabolomics, etc.) and integrative biology published by Mary Ann Liebert. The journal was founded in 1995 as Genome Science and Technology, changing its name to Microbial & Comparative Genomics in 1997, eventually acquiring its current title in 2004. The journal is now edited by Vural Özdemir (Amrita University). Since 2008 the journal has been published online only.

Abstracting and indexing
The journal is abstracted and indexed in the following bibliographic databases:

According to Journal Citation Reports, the journal has a 2020 impact factor of 3.374.

References

External links

Publications established in 1995
Biology journals
Monthly journals
Mary Ann Liebert academic journals
English-language journals